Kraken II  is the name of the second studio album Colombian group Kraken  It was released in December 5, 1989 by Codiscos. The first single from the album was "Vestido de Cristal". The second single was "Una Vez Más".

Information 

Kraken II was produced taking into account a wider rock audience. Its composition took a record time for the group members since they had to comply with live shows and the production of all the material that they had to select and create. A keyboardist replaced the former lead guitarist because of the need for a sound more akin to their influences and musical objectives to keep up with rock bands of the day. For the first time in Colombian history, a hard rock song (the opening track) Vestido de Cristal became the most played song on national youth radio stations. The inclusion of keyboards was definitive for this album, despite the criticism and the fear of using these instrument.

Track listing

Personnel 

 Elkin Ramírez: vocals, lyrics
 Hugo Restrepo: guitar
 Jorge Atehortua: electric bass
 Gonzalo Vásquez: drums
 Víctor García: keyboards, sound engineer, producer

Kraken (band) albums
1989 albums